Amour (French for love) may refer to: 

 Amour (1970 film), a Danish film
 Amour (2012 film), a French-language film directed by Michael Haneke
 Amour (musical), a 1997 stage musical by Michel Legrand
 Amour (Stockhausen), a 1974–76 cycle of clarinet pieces by Karlheinz Stockhausen
 Amour (Vidhan Sabha constituency), an assembly constituency in Purnia district, Bihar, India
 Amour Abdenour (born 1952), Kabyle singer, songwriter, and composer
 Amour Patrick Tignyemb (born 1985), Cameroonian footballer
 "Amour", a song by Rammstein from Reise, Reise
 Kimora Amour, Canadian drag queen

See also 
 "Amour, Amour", a song by Plastic Bertrand
 D'Amour (surname)
 L'Amour (disambiguation)
 Saint-Amour (disambiguation)
 Amore (disambiguation)
 Armour (disambiguation)
 Love (disambiguation)

French unisex given names